Jari Pedersen (born 2 September 1976) is a Danish former professional footballer who played as a striker. He later worked as a coach.

Career
Pedersen played club football for AaB and Lyngby FC.

By October 2006 he was working as a player-manager of amateur club Aalborg Chang, alongside René Tengstedt.

References

1976 births
Living people
Danish men's footballers
AaB Fodbold players
Lyngby Boldklub players
Aalborg Chang players
Danish Superliga players
Association football forwards
Danish football managers
Aalborg Chang managers